A religious official is a person, in a clergy or Holy Order, who has the authority over religious ceremonies or rituals (worship). 

It may mean:
 
 Priest / Priestess
 Minister
 Rabbi
 Imam
 Pastor
 Brahmin
 Vedic priest
 Archpriest
 Hieromonk
 Vicar
 Mobad
 Shaman
 Witch doctor
 Goði
 Druid
 Oracle

See also
 Priesthood (Community of Christ)
 Priesthood (Latter Day Saints)